The following is a list of Grammy Awards winners and nominees from Poland:

Notes

References

Polish

 Grammy
Grammy
Grammy